This is a list of mosques in Kenya.

 
Kenya
Mosques